

Geography

Hydrology

Landscape

Climate 

The Shelton Buttes are a mountain group of Buttes in Humboldt County, California.

References 

Buttes of California
Mountain ranges of Northern California
Mountain ranges of Humboldt County, California